Isaiah Johnson (born November 7, 1994) is an American basketball player for KD Hopsi Polzela in Slovenia's Premier A Slovenian Basketball League. Nicknamed "Big Dog," he played college basketball at the University of Akron, where he was named the Mid-American Conference Player of the Year for the 2016–17 season.

College career
Johnson, a 6'10", 290-pound center, played basketball and football at Walnut Hills High School in Cincinnati, Ohio. He was recruited by college coaches in both sports, but opted to play basketball at Akron. After two seasons in a reserve role, Johnson became a key player off the bench for the Zips as a junior in 2015–16, averaging 13.6 points and 7.6 rebounds per game and was named first-team All-Mid-American Conference (MAC) and the MAC Sixth Man of the Year.

As a senior in the 2016–17 season, Johnson entered the starting lineup full-time. He averaged 16.6 points and 7.1 rebounds and provided one of the season's highlights when he uncharacteristically hit a buzzer-beating three-pointer to beat Ball State. He led the Zips to a second consecutive MAC regular season title and was named the conference player of the year.

Professional career
For the 2017–18 season, Johnson signed with KFUM Nässjö in Sweden's Basketligan.

Personal life
Johnson is the grandson of Cleveland Browns football player Walter Johnson III. He also is the son of Walter Johnson, IV, and Yvonne Cook. He has six siblings, including Walter Johnson, V, Donshea Montez Harris, Miles Harris, Justin Johnson, Ryan Johnson and Autumn Johnson.

References

https://gozips.com/roster.aspx?rp_id=1806

External links
Akron Zips bio

1994 births
Living people
Akron Zips men's basketball players
American expatriate basketball people in Sweden
American men's basketball players
Basketball players from Cincinnati
Centers (basketball)